The Poutu Fault Zone is a seismically active area of the central North Island of New Zealand.

Geology
The intra-rift Poutu Fault Zone extends  from inland of Turangi on the shores of Lake Taupō towards Mount Ruapehu on the east side of the mountain. The southern end of the Poutu North fault is in close proximity to a number of recently active vents of Mount Tongariro. The northern end of the Poutu North fault essentially passes under the volcanic peak of Pihanga. Accordingly there is the potential for both active faulting and magmatic processes to trigger earthquakes. The relative proportions contributed is important for determining earthquake associated risk and previous assumptions about magmatic processes being dominant are not the case. However magmatic activity is associated with higher earthquake activity and increased slippage rate. This is essentially a tectonic fault zone making up the south eastern intra-rift faults of the Tongariro Graben in the Taupō Rift. The fault zone may well extend beyond the shore line of Lake Taupo. The Poutu fault zone to the south appears discontinuous to the active faults on the eastern side of the Ruapehu graben. Up to magnitude 6.9 earthquakes might occur with a mean of 6.6 about every 550 years along the fault.

References

Seismic faults of New Zealand
Taupō Volcanic Zone
Tongariro Volcanic Centre